The 2012–13 Liga Leumit was the fourteen season since its introduction in 1999 and the 71st season of second-tier football in Israel. It began on 24 August 2012 and ended on 20 May 2013.

A total of sixteen teams contested in the league, including twelve sides from the 2011–12 season, one promoted team from the 2011–12 Liga Alef and three relegated teams from the 2011–12 Israeli Premier League.

Changes from 2011–12 season

Structural changes
There were five structural changes:
The middle playoff was cancelled, with only top and bottom playoff to be contested by eight teams each, according to their regular season placement. with each team plays 37 matches.
The points were no longer halved after the regular season.
Two teams will be promoted to the 2013–14 Israeli Premier League, and two relegated teams from Israeli Premier League.
Two teams were directly relegated to 2013–14 Liga Alef, Two teams were directly promoted from Liga Alef, and two relegated teams from the Israeli Premier League.
The 14th place team will compete against the Liga Alef promotion play-off winner for the last spot in 2013–14 Liga Leumit.

Team changes

Hapoel Ramat Gan were promoted to the 2012–13 Israeli Premier League after beating Hapoel Bnei Lod in the 2011–12 Liga Leumit promotion playoff.

Hapoel Petah Tikva, Hapoel Rishon LeZion, and Maccabi Petah Tikva were directly relegated to the 2012–13 Liga Leumit after finishing the 2011–12 Israeli Premier League season in the bottom three places.

Ironi Bat Yam, Hapoel Herzliya, and Maccabi Be'er Sheva were all relegated to Liga Alef after finishing in the previous season in last three league places. They were replaced by Maccabi Yavne who were promoted to the 2012–13 Liga Leumit after beating Hapoel Asi Gilboa on away goals rule (0–0 away, 2–2 home) in the 2011–12 Liga Alef promotion playoff.

Overview

Stadia and locations

 The club is playing their home games at a neutral venue because their own ground does not meet Premier League requirements.

Regular season

Regular season table

Regular season results

Playoffs
Key numbers for pairing determination (number marks position after 30 games):

Top Playoff

Top Playoff table

Top Playoff results

Bottom Playoff

Bottom Playoff table

Bottom Playoff results

Relegation playoff

Relegation playoff
The 14th-placed Beitar Tel Aviv Ramla faced 2012–13 Liga Alef promotion winner Beitar Kfar Saba. Beitar Tel Aviv Ramla, the winner on aggregate kept its spot in the 2013–14 Liga Leumit. The matches took place on May 24 and 27, 2013.

Beitar Tel Aviv Ramla won 4–2 on aggregate.

Top goalscorers

Source: Israel Football Association

Hat-tricks

Season statistics

Scoring
First goal of the season:  Shlomi Ashur for Hapoel Rishon LeZion against Hakoah Amidar Ramat Gan, 12th minute (24 August 2012)
Most goals in a match by one player: 3 goals – 
 Maor Ida for Hakoah Amidar Ramat Gan against Hapoel Ashkelon (14 September 2012)
 Omer Golan for Maccabi Petah Tikva against Hapoel Ashkelon (22 December 2012)
 Eran Malkin for Hapoel Nazareth Illit against Hapoel Bnei Lod (12 February 2013)
 Itzik Cohen for Hapoel Jerusalem against Hapoel Petah Tikva (5 April 2013)
 Gil Blumstein for Hapoel Ashkelon against Beitar Tel Aviv (4 May 2013)

Discipline
First yellow card of the season:  Orel Edri for Maccabi Yavne against Maccabi Herzliya, 18th minute (24 August 2012)
First red card of the season:  Dudu Avraham for Maccabi Yavne against Maccabi Herzliya, 47th minute (24 August 2012)

See also
 2012–13 Israel State Cup
 2012–13 Toto Cup Leumit

References

Liga Leumit seasons
Israel
2012–13 in Israeli football leagues